Caranqui, or Cara (Kara), is an extinct, probably Barbacoan language of Ecuador.

Caranqui was replaced by Quechua, perhaps surviving as late as the 18th century. It seems in turn to have influenced Imbabura Quechua. There are similarities between Caranqui and the Barbacoan languages Pasto and Tsafiki, so Caranqui is often classified as Barbacoan, but the evidence is not conclusive due its poor documentation.

References

Barbacoan languages
Extinct languages of South America
Languages of Ecuador
Languages extinct in the 18th century
Unclassified languages of South America